Canary Fly, S.L., doing business as Canaryfly (IATA : PM, ICAO : CNF), is a Spanish airline that operates regular flights between the Canary Islands.  

Its head office is in Hangar L at Gran Canaria Airport.

History 
Canaryfly was founded in 2008 as Canarias Aeronautica operating flights between Canary Islands and Africa. In May 2012, Canaryfly started its first inter-island route (between different islands of the Canary archipelago) Canaryfly is led by Régulo Andrade and has more than 150 employees in 20 departments.

Fleet

Current fleet 
As of July 2022, the Canaryfly fleet consists of the following aircraft:

Historical fleet

Routes
Canaryfly serves the following domestic destinations (as of March 2017):

Gran Canaria – Lanzarote
La Palma - Tenerife
Fuerteventura – Gran Canaria
Gran Canaria – Tenerife
Tenerife – Lanzarote
Tenerife – Fuerteventura
Gran Canaria – El Hierro
Tenerife – El Hierro

References

External links

Airlines of Spain
Transport in the Canary Islands
Airlines established in 2008
Spanish companies established in 2008